Geoffrey Starling (fl.1377–1395) was an English Member of Parliament.

Life
Starling was the son of Geoffrey Starling of Ipswich. Geoffrey married, before June 1384, Margaret, and they had a son, John Starling, MP for Ipswich.

Career
Starling was a Member of Parliament for Ipswich in January 1377, 1381, May 1382, October 1382, February 1383, October 1383, 1386, February 1388, January 1390, 1391, 1393 and 1395.

References

Year of birth unknown
Year of death unknown
Members of the Parliament of England (pre-1707) for Ipswich
14th-century births
English MPs January 1377
English MPs 1381
English MPs May 1382
English MPs October 1382
English MPs February 1383
English MPs October 1383
English MPs 1386
English MPs February 1388
English MPs January 1390
English MPs 1393
English MPs 1395
People from Ipswich